Andy Flynn may refer to:

Andy Flynn (footballer) (1895–?), English professional footballer
Andy Flynn (EastEnders), fictional character from EastEnders
Andy Flynn (The Closer), fictional character from The Closer